Bas de Jong (born 11 September 1973) is a Dutch water polo player. He competed at the 1996 Summer Olympics and the 2000 Summer Olympics.

References

1973 births
Living people
Dutch male water polo players
Olympic water polo players of the Netherlands
Water polo players at the 1996 Summer Olympics
Water polo players at the 2000 Summer Olympics
People from Willemstad